Gnaphalodes trachyderoides is a species of beetle in the family Cerambycidae, the only species in the genus Gnaphalodes.

References

Bothriospilini
Monotypic Cerambycidae genera